1938 is an EP released by Soul-Junk in 2002 on Salad Dressing records. It comes packed in a 5¼ floppy disk, and only 500 were produced. "Vesuvius Re-Ups Erupts" is a remix of "Vesuvius" from 1957.

Track listing

Credits
Glen Galaxy
Slo-Ro
Produced by Soul-Junk
Mastering – Rafter Roberts
Artwork – Paul Goode, Jonathan Dueck, and Michael K
Tracking – Tim Coffman

Packaging
The EP is notable for being packaged in a floppy disk, a technique also done by New Order ("Blue Monday") and Fatboy Slim (Better Living Through Chemistry.)

Soul-Junk EPs
2002 EPs